Switzerland competed at the 1992 Summer Paralympics in Barcelona, Spain. 41 competitors from Switzerland won 35 medals including 6 gold, 16 silver and 13 bronze and finished 20th in the medal table.

See also 
 Switzerland at the Paralympics
 Switzerland at the 1992 Summer Olympics

References 

Nations at the 1992 Summer Paralympics
1992
Paralympics